Albert Daniel "Dubbie" Kerr (March 8, 1889 – September 17, 1941) was a Canadian professional ice hockey player. He was a member of the 1909 and 1911 Ottawa Senators Stanley Cup-winning teams. Born in Brockville, Ontario, he started out as a professional with the Pittsburgh Lyceum and Pittsburgh Athletic Club in 1907 before returning to Canada with the Toronto Pros in 1908. He played with the Senators from 1909 until 1912. In 1913, he moved out west to play in the Pacific Coast Hockey Association until 1920 for the Victoria Aristocrats.

Playing career
Kerr started his career in his hometown of Brockville, Ontario, playing junior and intermediate amateur hockey for Brockville of the Ontario Hockey Association. He turned professional in Pittsburgh, Pennsylvania in 1907-08. Kerr started 1908–09 with Pittsburgh, but left after seven games to join the Toronto team of the Ontario Professional Hockey League. After three games in Toronto, Kerr jumped to the Ottawa Senators and became a star.

Ottawa was rebuilding after the "Silver Seven" years and was seeking a player on left wing. Executive Weldy Bate had read that Kerr had scored five goals in a game for Toronto. Bate sent coach Pete Green who confirmed Kerr's ability and an offer was made to Kerr, who then moved to Ottawa. He played with future Hall of Famers Marty Walsh and Billy Gilmour. He also played alongside Bruce Ridpath and scored 20 goals in nine games as Ottawa won the Eastern Canada Hockey Association title and the Stanley Cup.

In 1910, Kerr suffered a serious skate cut to his right eye, at first losing his sight, necessitating an eye operation, limiting his play to five games. He would recover to play in the 1910–11 season. During the 1910–11 season, he along with Walsh and Ridpath, scored in twelve consecutive games, including five in one game and had 32 goals in 16 games to finish behind Walsh in NHA scoring. Kerr, Ridpath and Walsh had one, two and three goals respectively in a 7–4 Stanley Cup challenge win over Galt, Ontario.

Kerr retired after the 1911–12 season but Lester Patrick lured him to Victoria, British Columbia of the Pacific Coast Hockey Association in 1913–14. He played three seasons with Victoria Aristocrats and moved with the club to Spokane for the 1916–17 season when the Victoria arena was taken over for wartime activities. Kerr served during World War I from 1917–19, but returned to ice hockey to play another season with Victoria, retiring in 1920.

Personal life
At the time of his death in 1941, Kerr was an employee of the McNamara Construction Company (founded by hockey players George and Howard McNamara) in Iroquois Falls, Ontario. He was laid to rest in Toronto, Ontario.

Statistics

Awards
 1907–08 WPHL 2nd All-Star team
 1908–09 ECHA 1st All-Star team
 1913–14 PCHA 1st All-Star team
 1916–17 PCHA 2nd All-Star team

References

Notes

External links

1889 births
1941 deaths
Canadian ice hockey left wingers
Ice hockey people from Ontario
Ottawa Senators (NHA) players
Ottawa Senators (original) players
Pittsburgh Athletic Club (ice hockey) players
Pittsburgh Lyceum (ice hockey) players
Spokane Canaries players
Sportspeople from Brockville
Stanley Cup champions
Victoria Aristocrats players